The 1972 All-Ireland Minor Football Championship was the 41st staging of the All-Ireland Minor Football Championship, the Gaelic Athletic Association's premier inter-county Gaelic football tournament for boys under the age of 18.

Mayo entered the championship as defending champions, however, they were defeated in the Connacht Championship.

On 24 September 1972, Cork won the championship following a 3-11 to 2-11 defeat of Tyrone in the All-Ireland final. This was their fifth All-Ireland title overall and their first in three championship seasons.

Results

Connacht Minor Football Championship

Quarter-final

Galway 2-11 Sligo 2-7.

Semi-finals

Mayo 2-10 Roscommon 1-8 Dr Hyde Park.

Galway 5-14 Leitrim 0-5.

Final

16th July Galway 4-11 Roscommon 1-11 Castlebar.

Leinster Minor Football Championship

Munster Minor Football Championship

Ulster Minor Football Championship

All-Ireland Minor Football Championship

Semi-finals

Final

References

1972
All-Ireland Minor Football Championship